Mohameth Djibril Ibrahima Sow (born 6 February 1997) is a Swiss professional footballer who plays as a midfielder for Bundesliga club Eintracht Frankfurt and the Switzerland national team.

Club career
Sow made his professional debut for Borussia Mönchengladbach on 25 October 2016, in the second round of the 2016–17 edition of the DFB-Pokal, against second-division club VfB Stuttgart. Sow was substituted on in the 88th minute for Lars Stindl. The match finished as a 2–0 home win for Gladbach.

In June 2017, Sow returned to Switzerland, agreeing to a four-year contract with Young Boys. The transfer fee paid to Borussia Mönchengladbach was reported as €1.7 million.

He was part of the Young Boys squad that won the 2017–18 Swiss Super League, their first league title for 32 years.

On 27 June 2019, Sow signed to Bundesliga club Eintracht Frankfurt a contract until 2024.

International career
Born in Switzerland, Sow is of Senegalese and Swiss descent. He earned his first appearance for the Switzerland national team on 8 September 2018, coming on as a substitute for Steven Zuber in a 6–0 win against Iceland in the UEFA Nations League. In May 2019, he played in 2019 UEFA Nations League Finals, where his team finished fourth. In 2021 he was called up to the national team for the 2020 UEFA European Championship, where the team created one of the main sensations of the tournament reaching the quarter-finals.

Personal life
Sow is the cousin of the female footballer Coumba Sow.

Honours
Young Boys
 Swiss Super League: 2017–18, 2018–19

Eintracht Frankfurt
UEFA Europa League: 2021–22

Individual
Swiss Super League Young Footballer of the Year: 2018–19
Swiss Super League Team of the Year: 2018–19

References

External links

 
 SFV Profile

1997 births
Living people
Footballers from Zürich
Swiss men's footballers
Switzerland youth international footballers
Switzerland under-21 international footballers
Switzerland international footballers
Association football midfielders
FC Zürich players
Borussia Mönchengladbach II players
Borussia Mönchengladbach players
BSC Young Boys players
Eintracht Frankfurt players
Swiss Super League players
Swiss Promotion League players
Bundesliga players
Regionalliga players
UEFA Euro 2020 players
2022 FIFA World Cup players
Swiss expatriate footballers
UEFA Europa League winning players
Expatriate footballers in Germany
Swiss expatriate sportspeople in Germany
Swiss people of Senegalese descent